Chesterfield Township may refer to the following places in the United States:

 Chesterfield Township, Macoupin County, Illinois
 Chesterfield Township, Michigan
 Chesterfield Township, New Jersey
 Chesterfield Township, Fulton County, Ohio

Township name disambiguation pages